Petróleo  ("Petroleum") is a 1936 Mexican film directed by Fernando de Fuentes.

External links
 

1936 documentary films
1930s Spanish-language films
Films directed by Fernando de Fuentes

Mexican black-and-white films
Mexican documentary films
1930s Mexican films